Presidential elections were held in Iran on 23 May 1997, which resulted in an unpredicted win for the reformist candidate Mohammad Khatami. The election was notable not only for the lopsided majority of the winner - 70% - but for the high turnout.  80% of those eligible to vote did so, compared to 50% in the previous presidential election.

During the election, voting age was 15 and more than half of Iran's population was younger than 25.

Candidates
The Council of Guardians blocked 234 candidates from running for the presidency because they lacked the religious and political qualifications. Only four candidates were permitted to run for office:
 Mohammad Khatami, Former Minister of Culture and Islamic Guidance
 Mohammad Reyshahri, Former Minister of Intelligence and National Security
 Reza Zavare'i, Member of Guardian Council
 Ali Akbar Nategh-Nouri, Incumbent Speaker of the Parliament of Iran

Disqualified candidates 
 Ebrahim Yazdi, secretary-general of Freedom Movement of Iran
 Habibollah Payman, leader of Movement of Militant Muslims
 Ezzatollah Sahabi, leading Nationalist-Religious figure
 Azam Taleghani, former member of the Iranian parliament

Declined to run 
 Mir-Hossein Mousavi, former Prime Minister

Issues
The candidates were asked about their opinion on the fatwa against Salman Rushdie. Ali Akbar Nateq-Nouri said that any "a good Muslim" would carry out the fatwa. Mohammad Khatami avoided the issue. Mohammad Khatami's supporters called Nateq-Nouri the "Taliban" of Iran.

Khatami ran on a platform of political liberalization at home and détente abroad and expressed support for the easing Islamic regulations "from women's dress to whether TV satellite dishes should be allowed."

Endorsements

Media 
During the elections, neutrality of Islamic Republic of Iran Broadcasting (IRIB) became a subject of dispute, as the organization was accused of supporting Nateq-Nouri and promoting conservative agenda.
 Salam supported Khatami
 Hamshahri supported Khatami
 Resalat supported Nateq-Nouri
 Kayhan supported Nateq-Nouri

Results

References

External links
Moderate triumphs in Iranian elections
Mohammad Khatami's background
Iran Elections: An Overview

Presidential elections in Iran
1997 elections in Iran
May 1997 events in Asia
Iran